Erwin House, also known as Erwinton Plantation and Hunting Club, is a historic home located near Allendale, Allendale County, South Carolina. It was built around 1828, and is a -story, white clapboard dwelling on a raised brick basement. The front façade features three dormers and a full-width piazza with 14 square wooden columns, that also extends halfway down each of the side facades. Dr. William Erwin, the original owner of Erwinton, his wife and sister-in-law were all excommunicated from Kirkland Church in 1833 for their affiliation with other denominations. They then formed the second Christian congregation, the Disciples of Christ, in South Carolina. They held weekly meetings at Erwinton until 1835 when the present meeting house was completed and dedicated as Antioch Christian Church.

It was added to the National Register of Historic Places in 1976.

References

Houses on the National Register of Historic Places in South Carolina
Houses completed in 1828
Houses in Allendale County, South Carolina
National Register of Historic Places in Allendale County, South Carolina